Kampong Danau is a coastal village in Tutong District, Brunei, about  from the district town Pekan Tutong. It is one of the villages within Mukim Telisai.

Administration 
The village head oversees the following villages:

Facilities 
The village primary school is Danau Primary School. It also shares grounds with Danau Religious School, the village school for the country's Islamic religious primary education.

Kampong Danau Mosque is the village mosque; it was built in 1973 and can accommodate 200 worshippers.

 is the village hall.

Notes

References 

Danau